Kombarov is a Russian surname. Notable people with the surname include:

 Dmitri Kombarov (born 1987), Russian footballer
 Kirill Kombarov (born 1987), Russian footballer, brother of Dmitri

See also
 Komarov (surname)

Russian-language surnames